Al-Tawbat mosque is a mosque in Tripoli, Lebanon. It was a Mamluk construction built in the 14th century. No founding inscription exists, maybe an existing one was destroyed by a flood. So the exact time of construction is not known. Perhaps it was built during the third reign of Al-Nasir Muhammad.
The building was destroyed by a flood that occurred on January 20, 1612. The mosque was restored in June of the same year. An inscription tells about the construction and restoration by Husayn Pasha ibn Yusuf Sayfa, the governor of Tripoli.

The outside of the building is not decorated.
The structure comprises a minaret in its northwestern corner. On a square base rests an octagonal shaft. On its top is a square balcony.
The entrance lies below the street level, some steps that are covered by an arch lead down to its door.
The central part is the prayer hall that is covered by vaults over which three green domes form its roof. In its center an axial mihrab is flanked by two smaller mihrabs to its sides like in the Mansouri Great Mosque.
The hall opens to a courtyard without a wall.

See also
 Islam in Lebanon

References

Sources
 

Mosques in Tripoli, Lebanon
Mamluk architecture in Lebanon